Murari Chand College (usually referred to as MC College) was the first college in the Sylhet Division. It was established in 1892, making it the seventh oldest college in Bangladesh. Since then it has played an important role in the educational, cultural, and political spheres of Greater Sylhet.

History 
M C College was established on 27 June 1892 by a local nobleman, Raja Girish Chandra Roy of Roynagar, Sylhet with four teachers and 18 students. The college was named after his maternal great-grandfather, Murari Chand Roy. It was located beside the present Raja GC School in Bandar Bazar. At the beginning it was a proprietary college funded by Chandra himself. The original college building collapsed in the 1897 Assam earthquake, of which Chandra himself was a victim. Though he survived the quakes, the calamity made him financially vulnerable. It was not possible for him to run the college from his own resources from thereon. He urged the government to take over the college so that it could continue as an educational institution. The government took over the college in 1908 after the death of Chandra. Then it became an aided college. On 1 April 1912 the college become fully government administered and was considered as an affiliated college of the University of Calcutta.

In 1916, Syed Abdul Majid upgraded Murari Chand College's status to first grade degree level and laid the school's foundation stone in Thackeray Hills alongside William Sinclair Marris in 1921.

Abdul Khaliq Choudhury of Bijli (1886-1948) was the first Muslim student of the college. He was a member of the Assam council from 1921 to 1936 as well as the South Sylhet Local Board and Dhaka University Syndicate.

In 1925 the college moved to its current campus at Thackarey Hills (now Tilagarh). It is spread on an area of 112 acres of land of a beautiful natural set-up. In 1942 the golden jubilee of the college was observed by the publishing of the Murari Chand College Golden Jubilee Volume. After the Partition of India in 1947, the college became an affiliate of the University of Dhaka. It then became an affiliate of the University of Chittagong in 1968. Finally in 1992, it becomes an affiliate of the National University, Bangladesh.

In 2001, the college had 130 teachers and 6,000 students. There are seven residential hostels for students, which is one of the best residential arrangements of students at the college level in Bangladesh.  In 2000, the college won the national award as the best educational institution.

The library of M C College is famous for its collection of books, which numbers around 100,000.

Currently, all the students of HSC first year obtained GPA 5 in SSC.

Academic departments

Arts
 English
 History
 Islamic History and Culture
 Islamic Studies
 Bangla
 Philosophy

Sciences
 Mathematics
 Physics
 Chemistry
 Zoology
 Botany
 Psychology
 Statistics

Social Sciences
 Economics
 Political Science
 Sociology

Infrastructure  and campus

There are currently nine academic buildings in the college. They consist of classrooms, a library, department offices, etc., and are mainly used to conduct classes. Almost all of the departments have their own academic buildings.

The central library of the college is one of the oldest in the country. It houses a huge number of volumes; many of them are rare. The library is widely used by researchers. It holds more than 60,000 books.

The botanical garden is run by the botany department and is the only of its kind in the Sylhet Division. The Zoology department runs a zoological museum which contains a collection of different animals.

The college has two hostels, one for males and one for females. The male hostel is made up of six blocks, with five blocks for Muslim students and one block for Hindu students. Another four-storey hostel is being built next to the hostel pond.

Extra-curricular activities
The first and old organisations of MC College, Mohona Cultural Organisation in bangla মোহনা সাংস্কৃতিক সংগঠন
There are 3 rover units and 1 girl in-rover unit run by the Bangladesh Scouts. The Mainamati Battalion of the Bangladesh National Cadet Corps have a platoon here. On 14 November 2017, the Murari Chand Debate Federation (MCDF) was established. The MCDF won first place amongst the Sylhet Division in Democracy International's Debate Championship 2018. Other activities include the Murari Chand College Press Club, Murari Chand Poetry Council, Dhrubak Club, Tourist Club, Theatre Murari Chand, Cultural Organisation, Chemistry Club, Botanical Society and Economics Club.

Principal
The current principal is Panna Rani Roy.

Notable alumni

 Sultan Md. Mansur Ahmed, Bangladeshi politician
 Dewan Mohammad Azraf, poet
 Shegufta Bakht Chaudhuri, governor of Bangladesh Bank (1987–1992) and advisor of the first Caretaker government of Bangladesh
 Moinul Hoque Choudhury, Assam minister
 Enamul Haque Chowdhury, Jatiya Party politician
 Farid Uddin Chowdhury, teacher, businessman and politician
 Shafiqur Rahaman Chowdhury, politician
 Mohammed Forash Uddin, former governor, Bangladesh Bank
 Joy Bhadra Hagjer, former MP of India; former HAD; Veterinary Minister Government of Assam
 Altaf Husain, former editor of the Dawn national English daily newspaper and former industry minister (1965–68).
 Syed Manzoorul Islam, writer
 Mohammad Ataul Karim, Bangladeshi American scientist; executive vice chancellor and provost of the University of Massachusetts Dartmouth
 Khalil Ullah Khan, Bangladeshi actor
 Mufti Nurunnessa Khatun, botanist, teacher, and horticulturist.
 Shah AMS Kibria, economist and ex- finance minister
 Abdul Malik, cardiologist
 Hafiz Ahmed Mazumder, businessman, politician and educationist
 Habibur Rahman (Tota Mia), member of the first Jatiya Sangsad
 Abul Mal Abdul Muhit, Finance minister of Bangladesh
 Nurul Islam Nahid, Education Minister of Bangladesh
 Saifur Rahman, former finance minister of Bangladesh
 Shafiqur Rahman, physician and Amir of the Bangladesh Jamaat-e-Islami
 Niharranjan Ray, historian
 Abu Taher, freedom fighter and leftist politician

References

External links
 Behind the Scene. Star Insight. 26 May 2007.
 Sylhet int’l trade fair uncertain. The Daily Star. 25 March 2006.

 
Colleges affiliated to National University, Bangladesh
Colleges in Sylhet District
Universities and colleges in Sylhet District
Educational institutions established in 1892
1892 establishments in India
Education in Sylhet